Air hockey is a Pong-like tabletop sport where two opposing players try to score goals against each other on a low-friction table using two hand-held discs ("mallets") and a lightweight plastic puck.

The air hockey table has raised edges that allow the puck to reflect off horizontally, and a very smooth, slippery surface that further reduces friction by suspending the puck on a thin cushion of air ejected from tiny vent holes built inside the surface. This causes the puck to hover and move easily across the table with little loss of velocity, which simulates the lubricated sliding of an ice hockey puck across a well polished rink, hence the name of the game.

Air hockey tables 

A typical air hockey table consists of a large smooth playing surface designed to minimize friction, a surrounding rail to prevent the puck and strikers (paddles) from leaving the table, and slots in the rail at either end of the table that serve as goals. On the ends of the table behind and below the goals, there is usually a puck return. Additionally, tables will typically have some sort of machinery that produces a cushion of air on the playing surface through tiny holes, with the purpose of reducing friction and increasing play speed. In some tables, the machinery is eschewed in favor of a slick table surface, usually plastic, in the interest of saving money in both manufacturing and maintenance costs. Note that these tables are technically not air hockey tables, since no air is involved; however, they are still generally understood to be as such due to the basic similarity of gameplay. There also exist pucks that use a battery and fan to generate their own air cushion, but as they are prone to breakage, they are commonly marketed only as toys. 
 

The only tables that are approved for play and sanctioned by the USAA (United States Air Hockey Association) and the AHPA (Air Hockey Players Association) for tournament play are 8-foot tables. Approved tables include all Gold Standard Games 8-foot tables; some 8-foot tables from Dynamo; and the original 8-foot commercial Brunswick tables. Other full-size novelty-type tables with flashing lights on the field of play, painted rails, and/or smaller pucks are not approved for tournament play but can be used to learn the game. There are also tables for air hockey having a size of 1.5, 2, or 2.5 feet. They are called a mini air hockey. This is due to the small dimensions of the table, bits, washers.

A striker (sometimes called a goalie, mallet or paddle) consists of a simple handle attached to a flat surface that will usually lie flush with the surface of the table. The most common paddles, called "high-tops", resemble small plastic sombreros, but other paddles, "flat-tops", are used with a shorter nub. 

Air Hockey pucks are discs made of Lexan polycarbonate resin. Standard USAA and AHPA-approved pucks are yellow, red, and green. In competitive play, a layer of thin white tape is placed on the face-up side. Air Hockey pucks come in circles and other shapes (triangle, hexagon, octagon, or square).

Four-player tables also exist, but they are not sanctioned for competitive play.

Gameplay 

Competitive (tournament) play is usually distinguished by the following:

 The mallet is gripped behind the knob using one's fingertips, not on top of it. This allows more wrist action and helps the player to move the striker around the table faster.
 For basic defense, the mallet is kept centered at least 8 inches out from the goal. In this position, very slight movements to the left and right will block virtually all straight shots.  To block bank shots, one pulls back quickly to the corners of the goal. This is known as the "triangle defense".
 Shots are often hit out of "drifts", where the puck travels in set patterns designed to throw off the opponent's expectations and timing. The most popular drifts are the "center", "diamond", "diagonal", and "L".
 Shots are often organized into meaning groups of shots which are hit with the same apparent delivery but opposite directions, caused by hitting the puck at slightly different locations on the striker. For example, a transverse motion of the right arm can lead to a "cut shot" to the left corner of the opponent's goal or a "right wall under" (bank off the right wall, into the right corner of the opponent's goal).

History 

Air hockey is a game resting on an older technology, the air table.  Air tables began as a conveyor technology allowing heavy objects like cardboard boxes to easily slide over a table surface.  The original air tables of the 1940s had rather large holes that were plugged by ball bearings.  An object sitting on the table would depress the balls, allowing air to escape and lift the object slightly off the table.

By 1967, this had been refined and repurposed as a tool for teaching elementary physics.  The table top was a sandwich of fiberboard or plexiglass sheets separated by a honeycomb structure.  The top surface was drilled with a grid of small holes, and the space between the boards was supplied with low-pressure compressed air, just enough to allow "air pucks" to float over the surface.  While these air tables were fun to play with, they were not yet a game.

In 1968, Sega released an arcade electro-mechanical game similar to air hockey, MotoPolo. Based on polo, two players moved miniature motorbikes around inside a cabinet, with each player attempting to knock the balls into the opponent's goal. It also used an 8-track player to play back the sounds of the motorbikes.

Air hockey was created by a group of Brunswick Billiards employees from 1969 to 1972. In 1969, a trio of Brunswick engineers – Phil Crossman, Bob Kenrick and Brad Baldwin – began work on creating a game using a low-friction surface. The project stagnated for several years until it was revived by Bob Lemieux, who then focused on implementing an abstracted version of ice hockey, with a thin disc, two strikers and slit-like goals equipped with photodetectors. It was then decided that the game might appeal to a larger market and air hockey was marketed and sold to the general public.  The original patents reference Crossman, Kendrick and Lemieux. as well as earlier work on air tables.

The game was an immediate financial success and by the mid-1970s there arose substantial interest in tournament play. As early as 1973, players in Houston had formed the Houston Air Hockey Association, and soon thereafter, the Texas Air-Hockey Players Association, codifying rules and promoting the sport through local tournaments at Houston pubs Carnabys, Damians, and the University of Houston. To ensure uniform play standards of the highest competitive quality, the United States Air-Table Hockey Association (USAA) was formed in 1975 by J. Phillip "Phil" Arnold, largely as an official sanctioning body. In this way, non-player friendly rules imposed by Brunswick corporation were rendered void, and the sport of air hockey was secured under the control of players since that time. Since its inception, the USAA has sanctioned at least one national-level or World championship each year, crowning 12 different champions over 30 years. In March 2015, the Air Hockey Players Association (AHPA) was announced and is providing air hockey players with an additional organization also overseeing the sport of air hockey. The two organizations run independently but abide by a similar set of rules and share many of the same players.  In July 2015, the AHPA crowned not only its first world champion but also the youngest in the history of the sport in Colin Cummings of Beaumont, TX.  Today, professional air hockey is played by a close-knit community of serious players around the world, with extensive player bases near Houston, San Francisco, Sacramento, Los Angeles, San Diego, Denver, Chicago, New York City, Boise, and Boston in the United States of America, Barcelona in Spain, Saint Petersburg, Moscow, and Novgorod in Russia. and Most and Brno in the Czech Republic. From the late 1980s, Caracas, Venezuela served as a hotbed of activity; three-time World Champion Jose Mora and other finalists originated from there. By 1999 most of the Venezuelan activity had disappeared.

Competitive air hockey

Tournament history 

USAA World Championships

AHPA World Championship

US Championship

European Championship

Texas State Open

Catalan Championship

Russian Open

Notes

References 

 
Games and sports introduced in 1972
Variations of hockey